On May 8, 1822, James Blair (DR) of  resigned.  A special election was held to fill the resulting vacancy.  Blair himself had been elected in a special election earlier in the same Congress.

Election results

Carter took his seat December 11, 1822.

See also
List of special elections to the United States House of Representatives

References

United States House of Representatives 1795 02
South Carolina 1822 09
South Carolina 1822 09
1822 09
South Carolina 09
United States House of Representatives 09